Effort optimism is the confidence that acquiring the skills valued by the majority of society, such as those skills measured by IQ tests, ACT, and SATs, are worthwhile.  This outlook is grounded on different cultural belief systems that link effort with success.

Effort and success 
Effort optimism refers to how strongly a student believes their hard work/effort in school will pay off with academic/school success. This is reinforced by the maxim that "If at first you don't succeed, try, try, again." A strong conviction generally results in greater success and can become a self-fulfilling prophecy, reinforcing that belief. When that conviction is weak or nonexistent, students generally experience less success, which reinforces the belief that effort doesn't matter.

Lack of effort optimism has often been described as an important part of the achievement gap between students with majority and minority backgrounds in the American educational system. Among minorities, parents are said to articulate a strong belief in education and its role in getting ahead but communicate an ambivalence about whether society will really reward school achievement. In this interpretation, minority students under-achieve because they have no confidence that performing well in the school system will, in fact, help them advance socially in the face of perceived discrimination.

Causes of Effort Optimism

Since before the Brown vs. Board of Education decision in 1954, minorities (mostly African American, Hispanic, and Native American students) have not been presented with educational opportunities equal to those of white Americans. A study conducted during the 2002-03 school year showed that the number of Blacks and Hispanics enrolled in public schools was more than triple the number of Whites. The majority of these schools were in high poverty areas, like Chicago, IL, and Detroit, MI. Most of these schools do not have equal educational resources either. In predominantly white US School Districts, spending on educational resources, such as highly qualified teachers, Advanced Placement courses, and updated textbooks, is, on average, 10 times higher. Even Black and Hispanic students whose scores on standardized academic tracking tests were equal to those of Whites were more likely to be placed in lower course levels than Whites were. The inequality present within the educational system poses a real threat to the future of minority students.

Another factor in effort optimism is the concept of Stereotype threat, which describes the process of one's fear of confirming a negative stereotype leading that individual to become that negative stereotype. This theory connects to this issue because stereotypes are consistently made about people of color. For example, a common and misinformed stereotype is that black people do not perform well on standardized tests, whereas white people do. The disparities in performance on standardized tests stem from, not skin color, but structural inequities. When black people are subjected to harassment almost on a daily basis, and reminded of this stereotype constantly, however, some may fall into the stereotype out of fear of conforming to it.

When it comes to Standardized Tests, people of color are at a significant disadvantage. As discussed in the previous paragraphs, because of the inequality present within the educational system, people of color are less likely to perform well on standardized tests because most are not prepared enough for these tests. This is due primarily to their schools' inability to teach them the material, for lack of sufficient funds. One example of this is Debra P. vs. Turlington, a controversial court case that was documented on the basis of racial bias in standardized testing. The SSAT II was deemed unconstitutional because students were either denied or granted their high school diplomas based on whether or not they passed the test. The courts found that this test had a disproportionately negative impact on black students, and the state of Florida admitted that they were knowingly setting a precedent for these students not to graduate. Students of color were not prepared well enough for a test soaked in discrimination, which, in the end, set them up for failure.

Consequences Involved with Effort Optimism

Because of effort optimism, under-education is very prevalent in society. In the United States, under-education is a serious problem for minorities. As stated above, people of color are seriously under-educated in comparison with white people. Apart from huge financial gaps, people of color face other problems, such as a lack of motivation to further their education because they are told beginning in their youth that they are not as important as whites, whether literally or figuratively. In fact, a study conducted in 2004 by the Harvard Education Publishing Group, showed that people of color are less likely to obtain post secondary degrees after high school because so many of them never graduate high school.

More serious consequences follow not graduating high school. In today's society, almost every career requires a college degree, now even a graduate degree. The number of unemployment in the United States is very high, however it is significantly higher for those without a college education. Unemployment in the United States in 2014 is approximately 4.5% for those with a college degree and 12.5% for those without a high school diploma.

These consequences can be averted if only we aren't taught in our youth that we can't do something. If instead children in schools are taught the curricula that is needed to accomplish these so-called impossible tasks, then there would be more students graduating high school. There would be more people interested in pursuing post-secondary education. It would help even more if education is taught on the basis of learning and intelligence, not one's race. Effort optimism would not be relevant if all students are taught equally and there was no divide between majority and minority students in schools.

See also

Learned helplessness

Notes

Books
 Jim Crow's Children: The Broken Promise of the Brown Decision - Peter H. Irons

Motivation
Positive psychology